is a Japanese professional footballer who plays as a defensive midfielder for Cerezo Osaka.

Suzuki was born in Tochigi and played youth football for Maebashi Ikuei High School and the University of Tsukuba before starting his professional career with Tokushima Vortis. After three seasons, Suzuki moved to Cerezo Osaka in 2022.

He has represented Japan at U-16, U-17 and U-18 level.

Club statistics

References

External links

Profile at Cerezo Osaka

1997 births
Living people
Japanese footballers
Association football midfielders
Tokushima Vortis players
Cerezo Osaka players
J1 League players
J2 League players